Ittefaq Iron Industries is a Pakistani company which manufactures steel and is based in Lahore, Pakistan. It is part of Al-Shafi Group which was once part of Ittefaq Group.

It was formed with the merger of Alshafi Steel and Ittefaq Sons.

It is listed on the Pakistan Stock Exchange.

References

Manufacturing companies based in Lahore
Steel companies of Pakistan
Manufacturing companies established in 2009
Companies listed on the Pakistan Stock Exchange
Pakistani companies established in 2009